The Tasmanian Ports Corporation, also known as TasPorts, is the  Tasmanian Government state owned corporation that has responsibility for the operation and management of all ports in Tasmania, Australia. TasPorts was created for the purpose of facilitating trade for the benefit of Tasmania, an island state, through the commercial provision of infrastructure and services.

History
The company was established on 1 January 2006 and incorporated the state's four port companies operating at that time; Hobart Ports Corporation, Port of Launceston, Port of Devonport Corporation and Burnie Port Corporation. Historically most regional ports had their own Marine Board or similar bodies. In the 1950s there were Harbour Trusts and Marine Boards with local responsibility for movement within each local port facility.

Current ports
Port facilities under the central authority of Tasports are operated at the ports of Bell Bay, Burnie, Devonport, Hobart, Lady Barron (Flinders Island), Smithton,  and Whitemark (Flinders Island).

See also 

 List of Tasmanian government agencies

References

External links
 

Government-owned companies of Tasmania
Ports and harbours of Tasmania
Transport in Tasmania
Port authorities in Australia
Companies based in Hobart